Jerrold "Jerry" Burroughs (born October 2, 1967) was a Republican representative in the Florida House of Representatives from 1994 to 1998. He represented the 1st district.

External links
Jerrold Burroughs' Florida House of Representatives Profile

1967 births
Living people
Republican Party members of the Florida House of Representatives